More Information Than You Require is a 2008 satirical almanac by John Hodgman. It is the follow-up to Hodgman's 2005 book The Areas of My Expertise. It was released October 21, 2008. The full title reads:

More Information Than You Require is the second part of a trilogy, concluding with a final book titled That Is All. This series of books is intended to be a collective whole, featuring continuous page numbering - that is, the last page of The Areas of My Expertise is page 236, and the first page of More Information Than You Require is page 237. The cover features John Hodgman holding a ferret, a reference to one of the "long cons" from The Areas of My Expertise.

The 700 Mole-men Project 

Analogously to the 700 Hoboes Project, Hodgman began a second illustration project for the 700 "Mole-manic Names" contained in More Information Than You Require. The website and Flickr group began accepting submissions on October 21, 2008.

References

External links

2008 non-fiction books
Books by John Hodgman